Nicholas Charles Schaus (born July 3, 1986) is an American professional ice hockey player who is currently an unrestricted free agent. He most recently playing for the Norfolk Admirals in the ECHL.

Playing career
Undrafted, Schaus spent four years at UMass Lowell (Hockey East) from 2006–10, recording 65 points (10-55) and 220 penalty minutes in 148 career games.

On March 22, 2010, he was signed as a free agent by the San Jose Sharks. After a season in the American Hockey League with Sharks affiliate, the Worcester Sharks, Schaus signed a one-year contract to remain in the AHL on July 5, 2011 with the Syracuse Crunch.

Unable to earn an NHL contract, Schaus embarked on a European career, signing a contract with Norwegian club, the Stavanger Oilers for the 2013–14 season on February 8, 2013. Schaus made an immediate impact with the Oilers, helping the club win the Championship in earning playoff MVP honors.

Schaus spent the 2014–15 season with German club, the Grizzly Adams Wolfsburg of the DEL. He helped the club reach the half final versus Champion Mannheim Eagles. Contributing 15 points in 45 games before opting to leave as a free agent at seasons end in signing with Austrian club, HC TWK Innsbruck on May 28, 2015.

After a season in the Czech Extraliga with HC Dynamo Pardubice, Schaus garnered attention from the Kontinental Hockey League and signed with contending club, Metallurg Magnitogorsk, to a one-year deal on May 10, 2017. In the 2017–18 season, Schaus cemented a regular role on the blueline of Magnitogorsk and contributed with 3 goals and 12 points in 37 games before he was traded by the club, to Chinese competitors Kunlun Red Star, in exchange for Wojtek Wolski on December 14, 2017.

As a free agent from Kunlun, Schaus continued in the KHL, agreeing to a one-year deal with Slovak club, HC Slovan Bratislava, on June 29, 2018. In the 2018–19 season, Schaus appeared in 10 games scoring 1 goal and 1 assist with Bratislava before opting to return to the Czech Extraliga with HC Kometa Brno on November 7, 2018. He registered 2 assists in 16 games with Brno, before rejoining his former club, Dynamo Pardubice, on January 11, 2019.

On September 23, 2021, Schaus extended his career by returning to the ECHL and signing with the Norfolk Admirals for the 2021–22 season.

Career statistics

Awards and honors

References

External links

1986 births
Living people
Ice hockey players from New York (state)
HC Dynamo Pardubice players
Elmira Jackals (ECHL) players
Fort Wayne Komets players
HC Kometa Brno players
HC Kunlun Red Star players
HC TWK Innsbruck players
UMass Lowell River Hawks men's ice hockey players
Metallurg Magnitogorsk players
Norfolk Admirals players
Norfolk Admirals (ECHL) players
Omaha Lancers players
Piráti Chomutov players
River City Lancers players
HC Slovan Bratislava players
Stavanger Oilers players
Syracuse Crunch players
Grizzlys Wolfsburg players
Worcester Sharks players
American men's ice hockey defensemen
American expatriate ice hockey players in Slovakia
American expatriate ice hockey players in the Czech Republic
American expatriate ice hockey players in Norway
American expatriate ice hockey players in Austria
American expatriate ice hockey players in Germany
American expatriate ice hockey players in Russia
American expatriate ice hockey players in Canada
American expatriate ice hockey players in China
American expatriate ice hockey players in Romania